Nathan John Bowley (born 3 August 2001) is an English cricketer who plays for Leicestershire County Cricket Club. He is a left-handed batter and right-arm off break bowler.

Early life
Bowley had been involved with Leicestershire cricket since he was 13 years old. He was educated at Loughborough University.

Career
In 2018 Bowley was named the Talent Cricket Young Player of the Season. That year he took 4–70 on debut for the Leicestershire second-XI as a 17-year-old. He signed his first professional contract with Leicestershire County Cricket Club in January 2020. This was extended in July 2020 after Bowley had a leading role in Leicestershire winning back to back under-17 one day championships, taking 4-20 from 9 overs in the final. The new contract took him to the end of 2022.

Bowley made his List A debut on 2 August 2022 in the Royal London One-Day Cup for Leicestershire against Surrey County Cricket Club at Guilford. He scored his maiden half century during his second match, against Middlesex at Radlett on 4 August, 2022.

References

External links

2001 births
English cricketers
Leicestershire cricketers
Living people